Connaught Bridge Power Station is a combined cycle (2 gas turbines and 1 steam turbine) and open cycle ( 4 gas turbines) power station located near Kampong Java in Klang, Selangor, Malaysia. It is one of the oldest power station in the country.

It was opened on 26 March 1953 by the High Commissioner for the Federation of Malaya, Sir Gerald Templer.

Capacity 
The Station has an installed generation capacity of 895 MW, the third largest of seven sister TNB power plants in the country. The power is produced through a combined-cycle block producing 315 MW, and 4 x GT13E1 open cycle gas turbines of 130 MW each.

As part of the Generation Division of the Tenaga Nasional Group of Malaysia, it shares and operates in support of the parent group's targets and objectives.

Redevelopment 
The Connaught Bridge Power Station is going through a redevelopment project.

The EPC contract was awarded to Sinohydro Corporation Ltd and Sinohydro Corporation (M) Sdn Bhd Consortium on 2 May 2013 with a contract period of 28 months. After the redevelopment, the plant with capacity of 384.7 MW will commence operation on 1 September 2015.

Access
The power station is near Bukit Badak Komuter station.

References

Natural gas-fired power stations in Malaysia
1953 establishments in Malaya